Olympias (flourished 4th century, died 361) also known as Olympia, sometimes known as Olympias the Elder to distinguish her from her niece of the same name was a Christian Roman noblewoman. Through her father, Olympias was connected to the Constantinian dynasty and through marriage was related to the Arsacid dynasty of Armenia.

Family and early life
Olympias was a Greek woman who was the daughter of the wealthy Cretan Flavius Ablabius by an unnamed woman. Ablabius was one of the most important Roman Senators of Constantinople; who held the Praetorian prefecture of the East from 329 to 337/338 and served as consul in 331, who was an active Roman Politician in the East and West. She had at least one known sibling, a brother called Seleucus. Olympias was born and raised either in Constantinople or Antioch, as her father during his political career was based in Antioch. Although her date of birth is unknown, Olympias may have been born between the years 324 to 330 and little is known on her early life.

Constantinian dynasty
As Olympias’ father had acquired great influence over the Roman emperor Constantine I who seem to be attached to the emperor. Shortly before the death of Constantine I, the emperor along with Ablabius had arranged for Olympias to be engaged to Constans one of the sons of the emperor. When Constantine I died in May 337, he was succeeded by his sons and among them was Constans. In 338, due to her father's fall out with Constans’ brother Constantius II and his execution, Constans never married Olympias. For as long as Constans lived, Constans took care of Olympias and they had lived together as if Olympias was the wife of Constans. In 350 when Constans died, Olympias still lived in Constantinople with the remaining relatives of Constans.

Wife of Arsaces II of Armenia
The Roman Client King of Arsacid Armenia Arsaces II (Arshak II), was greatly favored by Constantius II who remitted all the Armenian taxes on the lands which the Kings of Armenia owned in Asia Minor. As a sign of the renewed Christian Arianism political alliance between Armenia and Ancient Rome, Constantius II had given to Arsaces II, Olympias as an imperial bride to him. Constantius II in the honor of Olympias, had struck special medals bearing the portrait of Olympias, who was the mother of the Greek King Alexander the Great, which the legend of the medals were in Latin OLYMPIAS REGINA or of queen Olympias. The reigning Armenian Catholicos St. Nerses I, was sent by Arsaces II from Armenia to bring Olympias from Constantinople back to Armenia to marry her as his wife.

Olympias is considered as the first known wife of Arsaces II, as prior to his kingship was previously married to an unknown woman by whom he had a son called Anob. Saint Athanasius of Alexandria in a letter addressed to the Anchorites, reproaches Constantius II for marrying Olympias to Arsaces II. Athanasius reproaches Constantius II, for having an educated woman like Olympias destined to be a wife of an emperor exalted to the dignity of a barbarian (foreign) king.

When Olympias arrived in Armenia with St. Nerses I, Olympias was married to Arsaces II. Although Olympias had no children with Arsaces II, they appeared to have a happy marriage, as Arsaces II loved Olympias. The Romans considered Olympias as the legitimate wife of Arsaces II as this Queen consort, maintained her influence on her husband. Arsaces II was faithful to the Roman and Christian alliance and Olympias would have become a very powerful, wealthy and influential woman in Armenian society.

Pharantzem
As Constantius II died in 361, Julian the Apostate succeeded his paternal cousin as Roman emperor. On Julian's accession, Olympias’ influence on her husband made his fidelity to waver.  Arsaces II later married the Armenian noblewoman Pharantzem who was the widow of Arsaces II's nephew, the Arsacid Prince Gnel. In Persian fashion Arsaces II had more than one wife. Sometime after Pharantzem's marriage to Arsaces II, she fell pregnant. In 360 Pharantzem bore Arsaces II a son, whom they named Papas (Pap). Papas was the only known child born to Pharantzem and the only known child born to Arsaces II during his Armenian Kingship.

Pharantzem had a grudge and had a great envy against Olympias, in which Arsaces II loved Olympias more than Pharantzem. Arsaces II loved Pharantzem to a degree but Pharantzem loathed Arsaces II saying, “Physically, he is hairy, and his color is dark”. After the birth of her son, Pharantzem plotted to kill Olympias through poison. Pharantzem had arranged for Olympias to be poisoned in 361 administered to her in the Holy Sacrament of communion by a priest from the royal court. Olympias was extremely careful in where she accepted matters of food and drink from as she only accepted food and drink offered to her from her maids. Olympias was poisoned through communion.

The death of Olympias, was one of the reasons that the church was totally alienated from the royal court of Arsaces II and St. Nerses I being totally outraged was not seen again in the royal court in the lifetime of Arsaces II. The actions of Pharantzem towards Olympias had placed Armenian politics unfavorable to Christian interests and she was considered an impious woman. After the death of Olympias, Pharantzem became the Armenian Queen.

References

Sources
 Faustus of Byzantium, History of the Armenians, 5th Century
 De Imperatoribus Romanis - An Online Encyclopedia of Roman Emperors: Constans I (337-350 A.D.)
 A.H.M. Jones, J.R. Martindale & J. Morris, The Prosopography of the Later Roman Empire: Volume 1, AD 260–395, Parts 260–395, Cambridge University Press, 1971
 F. Millar, The Roman Near East, 31 B.C.-A.D. 337, Harvard University Press, 1993
 M.R. Salzman, The Making of a Christian Aristocracy: Social and Religious Change in the Western Roman Empire, Harvard University Press, 2002
 P. Moret & B. Cabouret, Sertorius, Libanios, iconographie: a propos de Sertorius, journée d'étude, Toulouse, 7 avril 2000 [suivi de] autour de Libanios, culture et société dans l'antiquité tardive : actes de la table ronde, Avignon, 27 avril 2000, Presses Univ. du Mirail, 2003
 R.G. Hovannisian, The Armenian People From Ancient to Modern Times, Volume I: The Dynastic Periods: From Antiquity to the Fourteenth Century, Palgrave Macmillan, 2004
 I. Nordgren, The Well Spring Of The Goths: About The Gothic Peoples in The Nordic Countries And On The Continent, iUniverse, 2004
 W. Smith & H. Wace, A Dictionary of Christian Biography, Literature, Sects and Doctrines N to S Part Seven, Kessinger Publishing, 2004
 E. Gibbon & J.B. Bury, The Decline And Fall Of the Roman Empire, Volume 2, Wildside Press LLC, 2004
 V.M. Kurkjian, A History of Armenia, Indo-European Publishing, 2008
 E. Gibbon, The History of the Decline and Fall of the Roman Empire (Google eBook), MobileReference, 2009

4th-century Romans
4th-century Roman women
Constantinian dynasty
4th-century Greek people
Anatolian Greeks
Antiochian Greeks
Armenian queens consort
4th-century Greek women